Kalulushi is a constituency of the National Assembly of Zambia. It covers the towns of Chambishi, Chimbula, Fibale and Kalulushi in Kalulushi District of Copperbelt Province.

The constituency was created in 1968 when Luanshya–Kalulushi was split in two.

List of MPs

References

Constituencies of the National Assembly of Zambia
Constituencies established in 1968
1968 establishments in Zambia